Hardegen is a surname. Notable people with the surname include:

 Kathryn Hardegen (born 1983), Australian chess player
 Reinhard Hardegen (1913–2018), German military officer

See also
 Hardegsen

German-language surnames